Gunless is a 2010 Canadian Western comedy film directed by William Phillips and released by Alliance Films.

Plot
In 1878, a hardened American gunfighter arrives in a small town in the foothills of the Canadian Rockies, a place that doesn't understand or appreciate the brutal code of the American Wild West.

Gunslinger Sean Lafferty (Paul Gross), known as the Montana Kid, has a bounty on his head for killing eleven people across the western United States.  He arrives in town on his horse, riding backwards, bound, with a noose around his neck, and dragging the broken tree branch over which a group had tried to hang him on the American side of the border. After being helped off his horse by a young Chinese girl named Adell (Melody B. Choi), he begins to explore the town, starting with the town general store. After leaving the store, he finds his horse gone and accuses Jack (Tyler Mane), the blacksmith, of stealing it, even though Jack was simply replacing the horse's damaged shoes. After unsuccessfully trying to intimidate the blacksmith, the Montana Kid decides to call him out. Since the blacksmith has no gun, though, Sean can't shoot him because the Kid lives by a code of ethics that prevents him from killing unarmed men.

When she witnesses this, Jane Taylor (Sienna Guillory), one of the townsfolk, says the Kid can have her broken gun (to fix and give to Jack) if he builds her a windmill. Sean proceeds to go with her and stays in a sod house at her farm, alternately working on the windmill and repairing the gun. After a few days, however, the Kid begins to develop feelings toward Jane while also becoming friends with the townsfolk.

In the meantime, a roaming band of American bounty hunters crosses into Canada and heads for the town to claim the price on Sean's head. They terrorize a camp of Chinese railway workers to find out his whereabouts.

By now - with the addition of a part repaired by the very blacksmith he intends to duel - Sean has finally fixed Jane's pistol. He proceeds to Jack's smithy to demand the duel, gives Jack the gun, and tells him to draw. However, Sean adjusts his aim so that he is pointing his six-shooter slightly to Jack's left (in a way that his shot will miss the blacksmith), providing an indication that he is done running and may want to die. The Kid tells Jack to pull the trigger, but the gun jams. The Kid takes the gun back from Jack to inspect it, but accidentally sets it off instead, with the ricocheting bullet hitting Jack in the left buttock (replicating the wound that the Kid himself had earlier in the film). After Dr. Angus Schiffron (Jay Brazeau) removes the fragmented bullet from Jack's buttock, the Kid agrees that he and the blacksmith are now even. He then prepares to leave town.

As the Kid is riding out of town at one end, the bounty hunters are riding in behind him at the other end. They threaten the townsfolk in an effort to get them to turn over the Kid. The townsfolk instead train their rifles and shotguns on the bounty hunters with the intent of defending themselves. At this time, the Kid has returned, and, not wanting any more bloodshed, Sean tells bounty hunter leader Ben Cutler (Callum Keith Rennie) that he will go with them if Ben agrees to leave everyone else alone. Ben accepts, but right then town resident Larry (Michael Eklund) sets off a pile of dynamite that he has placed under a large tree stump by his farmhouse in an effort to get the stump out of the ground. This sets off confusion and sparks a gunfight between the bounty hunters on one side and Sean and the townsfolk on the other. The battle ultimately ends in the town's favour after the Kid takes out Ben's crew without killing any of them. The bounty hunters end up being escorted out of Canada by the local detachment of the North-West Mounted Police, and Sean decides to remain in town. He says he's staying because of a bunch of debts he has to pay off, but he really stays to be with Jane.

Cast
 Paul Gross as Sean Lafferty, the Montana Kid
 Sienna Guillory as Jane
 Dustin Milligan as Corporal Jonathan Kent
 Callum Keith Rennie as Ben Cutler
 Tyler Mane as Jack Smith
 Graham Greene as Two Dogs
 Michael Eklund as Larry

Production
The production was filmed at Osoyoos, British Columbia, on an approximate budget of $10 million.

Release
The film was released by Alliance Films in Canada on 30 April 2010.

Reception
The film has received mainly mixed reviews.

 Citytv  - "... it looked like a production that should be airing on the CBC rather than in the theatre."
 Fast Forward Weekly (mixed) - "Yes, it’s a comedy and a fun one at that, but the lack of depth and substance leaves you with all the satisfaction and aftertaste of a Tim Hortons doughnut."
 The Globe and Mail  - "Gunless is harmless, the sort of pop entertainment that sets its sights low and doesn’t underachieve."
 National Post  - "As funny as necessary, but not necessarily funny."
 Toronto Star  - "The humour in Gunless is more sitcom than scathing, playing like something that could have been called Corner Gas 1882."
 Toronto Sun (positive) - "... it’ll probably be the least depressing Canadian film this year. A feel-good experience, in fact."
 Winnipeg Free Press  - "The movie is sporadically amusing, but it works against itself in a couple of ways, most notably in casting affable Canuck Paul Gross as a violent Yank."
 Vancouver Sun  - "It's a genial enough comedy that's a combination of love story, cultural critique, farce and revenge yarn, which means it's none of them."

References

External links
Official
 
 Gunless  at Alliance Films
 The Search for Barclay's Brush
Database
 
 
 

2010 films
English-language Canadian films
2010s Western (genre) comedy films
Canadian Western (genre) comedy films
Films set in Canada
Films set in 1878
Films shot in British Columbia
Films directed by William Phillips
Brightlight Pictures films
2010 comedy films
2010s English-language films
2010s Canadian films